Paz Buttedahl (April 8, 1942 – October 8, 2007) was a Canadian former professor at University of British Columbia and Royal Roads University, a researcher and an educator specialized in global education and international development issues. She was married to Knute Buttedahl and was the co-founder and president of Buttedahl R & D Associates (BRDA), Vancouver BC. She was also the founder and director of VIA Vancouver Institute for the Americas with a main campus in Vancouver BC and an overseas campus in Santiago, Chile. Buttedahl was a member of the World Academy of Art and Science and participated in the Peacebuilding Commission.

Early life 
She was born Cecilia Paz Goycoolea Grunwald, in Vicuña Mackenna, Santiago, Chile to an upper-middle-class family of European descent. Her father came from a Roman Catholic family originally from Euskadi Basque Country, Spain, and her mother from a Jewish Eastern European family. She had two sisters, Loreto and Sofia, and a brother, Valerio.

Education 

Buttedahl attended a boarding school that was run by nuns. Feeling an affinity with the nuns' lifestyle, she joined their order, the Teresian Carmelite Missionaries in the World (CMT) after graduating from high school and was sent to work at the convent "Santa Teresa delle Suore Carmelitane Missionarie Teresiane" in Nogoyá, Argentina. After a couple of years at the convent and just before taking her nun's vows, she decided to work in education and terminated her service at the monastery. She became an elementary school teacher at "Immaculata of Buenos Aires", a private Roman Catholic all girls school in Argentina.

While teaching at the school, Buttedahl became the holder of an international scholarship with the help of the church and moved to the United States to produce a television program for Latin American children that focused on current affairs, promoting staying in school. Her project was successful in the US and she had the opportunity to obtain a scholarship from Florida State University in Tallahassee, where she earned her doctorate in adult learning and international development. This is also where she met her second husband, Dr. Knute Buttedahl. In 1975 they moved to Toronto, Ontario with her two children from her first marriage.

Career
Buttedahl and Knute worked together at the Canadian Association for Adult Education (now the Canadian Association for the Study of Adult Education) in Toronto, Ontario, until they moved to Vancouver in 1978. She would eventually return to Ontario in the mid-1980s becoming project manager and program director for the International Development Research Centre (IDRC), while her husband worked with the Canadian International Development Agency (CIDA) conducting and implementing projects on international development and global education, mainly in Latin America and Asia. They would return to Vancouver in the late 1990s.

In 1978, Buttedahl moved with her family to Vancouver, BC, Canada, taking an academic position at the Faculty of Education, at UBC (University of British Columbia). In 1980, while working in academia, she co-founded with Knute, a non-government-organization (NGO) to provide services in Global Education to developing countries, they launched BRDA Buttedahl R & D Associates, an R&D firm which published adult education material and international development reports centered in sustainable education, integrating academics and field research working across borders, in multi-cultural and multi-lingual settings, cutting across multiple time zones, ensuring smooth transfer of new knowledge and technology to other groups or departments involved in innovation and Global R&D management. BRDA was based in Vancouver BC, providing consultancy services in research, editing, and publishing to projects funded by international agencies and organizations, among their clients included the Canadian International Development Agency (CIDA), The United Nations Education, Scientific and Cultural Organization (UNESCO), the U.S. Agency for International Development (USAID), and the Organization of American States (OAS).

In 1998, Buttedahl launched VIA Vancouver Institute for the Americas, a Global  Education arm at UBC operating in partnership with the Vancouver Institute Lectures program, to support research on Human Resources Development and Training Programs for worldwide implementations. VIA Vancouver Institute for the Americas assisted programs under the umbrella of UNESCO and CIDA, also participated in large multinational Educational Reform implementations.

After the death of Knute, she began to work on the evolution of VIA's own creative projects centered in Women in development, and took an academic position in Victoria BC at Royal Roads University, where she went on to launch a Master's program centered in Peace-building and Governance. While working in Victoria she met and married John K. Park.

Legacy 
Beside participating in public presentations and conferences world-wide, her extensive research and writing work, Buttedahl aided her interns and young consultants working on international development projects world-wide.
An award was created in her honor, the  "Paz Buttedahl Career Achievement Award in Academia".

References

External links 

 Dr. Rajesh Tandon - speaker for the Knute & Paz Buttedahl Memorial Lecture Held March 8, 2013. (Educational Studies) -  YouTube https://www.youtube.com/watch?v=M8dvoTrsjRc
 Robert Hogg receives the "Paz Buttedahl Career Achievement Award" - SFU.ca - https://www.sfu.ca/fhs/news-events/news/year/2013/robert-hogg-receives-career.html

1942 births
Florida State University alumni
Chilean academics
Writers from Vancouver
Chilean people of Basque descent
Academic staff of the Royal Roads University
Founders of educational institutions
Academic staff of the University of British Columbia